The Fiat Zero, known also as the Fiat 12/15 hp,  was a car produced by FIAT from 1912 to 1915. (The letters 'hp' defined its fiscal horse power rather than its bhp.) At launch it sold for 8,000 lire, which later was reduced to 6,900 lire, the equivalent of 23,250 € in 2003. It was the first Fiat to sell more than 2,000 similarly bodied units and most of these were four seater bodies. In 1915 production came to an end when the factory was converted for war production.

There were also light bodied version produced which claimed various speed records.

References
Fiat Group, "History,"  (Retrieved December 27, 2005)

External links

Zero

Cars introduced in 1912